The Christmas EP may refer to:

 The Christmas EP (Enya EP)
 The Christmas EP (Hey Monday EP)
 The Christmas EP (Richard Marx EP)